Guifeng Zongmi (780–1 February 841) was a Tang dynasty Buddhist scholar and bhikkhu, installed as fifth patriarch of the Huayan school as well as a patriarch of the Heze school of Southern Chan Buddhism. He wrote a number of works on the contemporary situation of Tang Buddhism, which also discussed Taoism and Confucianism. He also wrote critical analyses of Chan and Huayan, as well as numerous scriptural exegeses.

Zongmi was deeply interested in both the practical and doctrinal aspects of Buddhism. He was especially concerned about harmonizing the views of those that tended toward exclusivity in either direction. He provided doctrinal classifications of Buddhist and non-Buddhist teachings, accounting for the apparent disparities in doctrines by categorizing them according to their specific aims.

Biography

Early years (780–810)
Zongmi was born in 780 into the powerful and influential He family in what is now central Sichuan. In his early years, he studied the Chinese classics, hoping for a career in the provincial government. When he was seventeen or eighteen, Zongmi lost his father and took up Buddhist studies. In an 811 letter to Chengguan, he wrote that for three years he "gave up eating meat, examined [Buddhist] scriptures and treatises, became familiar with the virtues of meditation and sought out the acquaintance of noted monks."

At the age of twenty-two, he returned to the Confucian classics and deepened his understanding, studying at the Yixueyuan 義學院 Confucian Academy in Suizhou. His later writings reveal a detailed familiarity with the Analects, the Classic of Filial Piety, and the Book of Rites, as well as historical texts and Daoist classics such as the works of Laozi.

Chan (804–810)
At the age of twenty-four, Zongmi met the Chan master Suizhou Daoyuan ( and trained in Chan for two or three years. He received Daoyuan's seal in 807, the year he was fully ordained as a Buddhist monk.

In his autobiographical summary he states that it was the Sutra of Perfect Enlightenment that led him to enlightenment, his "mind-ground opened thoroughly [...] Its [the scripture’s] meaning was as clear and bright as the heavens." Zongmi's sudden awakening after reading only two or three pages of the scripture had a profound impact upon his subsequent scholarly career. He propounded the necessity of scriptural studies in Chan, and was highly critical of what he saw as the antinomianism of the Hongzhou lineage derived from Mazu Daoyi (709–788), which practiced "entrusting oneself to act freely according to the nature of one’s feelings". But Zongmi's Confucian moral values never left him and he spent much of his career attempting to integrate Confucian ethics with Buddhism.

Hua-yan (810–816)
In 810, at the age of thirty, Zongmi met Lingfeng 靈峯, a disciple of the preeminent Buddhist scholar and Huayan exegete Chengguan (738–839). Lingfeng gave Zongmi a copy of Chengguan's commentary and subcommentary on the Avatamsaka Sutra. The two texts were to have a profound impact on Zongmi. He studied these texts and the sūtra with great intensity, declaring later that due to his assiduous efforts, finally "all remaining doubts were completely washed away."  In 812 Zongmi travelled to the western capital, Chang'an, where he spent two years studying with Chengguan, who was not only the undisputed authority on Huayan, but was also highly knowledgeable in Chan, Tiantai, the vinaya and East Asian Mādhyamaka.

Mount Zhongnan (816–828)
Zongmi withdrew to the Zhongnan Mountains southwest of Chang'an in 816 and began his writing career, composing an annotated outline of the Sutra of Perfect Enlightenment, and a compilation of passages from four commentaries on the sūtra. For the next three years Zongmi continued his research into Buddhism, reading through the Buddhist canon, the Tripiṭaka, and traveling to various temples on Zhongnan. He returned Chang'an in 819 and continued his studies utilizing the extensive libraries of various monasteries in the capital city. In late 819 he completed a commentary and subcommentary on the Diamond Sutra. In early 821 he returned to Cottage Temple beneath Gui Peak and hence became known as "Guifeng Zongmi". In mid-823, he finally finished his own commentary on the text that had led to his first awakening experience, Sutra of Perfect Enlightenment, and the culmination of a vow he had made some fifteen years earlier. For the next five years, Zongmi continued writing and studying in the Zhongnan Mountains as his fame grew.

Capital city (828–835)
He was summoned to the capital in 828 by Emperor Wenzong (r. 826–840) and awarded the purple robe and the honorific title "Great Worthy" (dade 大德; bhadanta). The two years he spent in the capital were significant for Zongmi. He was now a nationally honored Chan master with extensive contacts among the literati of the day. He turned his considerable knowledge and intellect towards writing for a broader audience rather than the technical exegetical works he had produced for a limited readership of Buddhist specialists. His scholarly efforts became directed towards the intellectual issues of the day and much of his subsequent work was produced at the appeals of assorted literati of the day. He began collecting every extant Chan text in circulation with the goal of producing a Chan canon to create a new section of the Buddhist canon. This work is lost but the title, Collected Writings on the Source of Chan ( Chanyuan zhuquanji 禪源諸詮集) remains.

Last years (835–841)
It was Zongmi's association with the great and the powerful that led to his downfall in 835 in an event known as the Sweet Dew Incident. A high official and friend of Zongmi, Li Xun, in connivance with Emperor Wenzong of Tang and his general Zheng Zhu, attempted to curb the power of the court eunuchs by massacring them all. The plot failed and Li Xun fled to the Zhongnan Mountains, seeking refuge with Zongmi. Li Xun was quickly captured and executed and Zongmi was arrested and tried for treason. Impressed with Zongmi's bravery in the face of execution, the powerful eunuch Yu Hongzhi persuaded fellow powerful eunuch Qiu Shiliang to spare Zongmi.

Nothing is known about Zongmi's activities after this event. Zongmi died in the zazen posture on 1 February 841 in Chang'an. He was cremated on 4 March at Guifeng temple. Twelve years later he was awarded the posthumous title "Samādhi-Prajñā Dhyāna Master" and his remains were interred in a stupa called Blue Lotus.

Philosophy
Zongmi's lifelong work was the attempt to incorporate differing and sometimes conflicting value systems into an integrated framework that could bridge not only the differences between Buddhism and the traditional Daoism and Confucianism, but also within Buddhist theory itself.

Confucianism, Daoism, Buddhism
Much of Zongmi's work was concerned with providing a dialogue between the three religions of China: Confucianism, Daoism and Buddhism. He saw all three as expedients, functioning within a particular historical context and although he placed Buddhism as revealing the highest truth of the three, this had nothing to do with the level of understanding of the three sages, Confucius, Laozi and Buddha, (who Zongmi saw as equally enlightened) and everything to do with the particular circumstances in which the three lived and taught. As Zongmi said:

Zongmi's early training in Confucianism never left him and he tried to create a syncretic framework where Confucian moral principles could be integrated within the Buddhist teachings.

Sudden and Gradual Enlightenment
Zongmi tried to harmonize the different views on the nature of enlightenment. For the Chan tradition, one of the major issues of the day was the distinction between the Northern line, which advocated a "gradual enlightenment" and the Southern line's "sudden enlightenment".

Coming from the Southern Chan tradition, Zongmi advocated the Southern teachings of sudden enlightenment. But he also saw both as according with the teachings of the Buddha. He wrote: 

Although the sudden teaching reveals the truth directly, and results in a "sudden" understanding that all beings are Buddhas, this does not mean that one attained Buddhahood rightaway. Hence, Zongmi advocated "sudden enlightenment" followed by "gradual cultivation". This gradual cultivation was to eliminate all remaining traces of defilements of the mind, that prevented one from fully integrating one's intrinsic Buddha-nature into actual behavior.) According to Zongmi:

"In terms of the elimination of hindrances, it is like when the sun immediately comes out, yet the frost melts gradually. With respect to the perfection of virtue, it is like a child which, when born, immediately possesses four limbs and six senses. As it grows, it gradually develops control over its actions. Therefore, the Hua Yen [Avatamsaka sutra] says that when the bodhicitta is first aroused, this is already the accomplishment of perfect enlightenment."

To explain this, Zongmi also used the metaphor of water and waves found in the Awakening of Faith treatise. The essential tranquil nature of water which reflects all things (intrinsic enlightenment) is disturbed by the winds of ignorance (un-enlightenment, delusion). Although the wind may stop suddenly (sudden enlightenment), the disturbing waves subside only gradually (gradual cultivation) until all motion ceases and the water once again reflects its intrinsic nature (Buddhahood). However, whether disturbed by ignorance or not, the fundamental nature of the water (i.e., the mind) never changes.

Classification of teachings
As with many Buddhist scholars of the day, doctrinal classification (p’an chiao) was an integral part of Zongmi's work. Zongmi's "systematic classification of Buddhist doctrine is itself a theory of the Buddhist path (mārga)."

He provided a critique of the various practices which reveal not only the nature of Chan in Tang dynasty, but also Zongmi's understanding of Buddhist doctrine.

The Buddha's Teachings
Zongmi arranged the Buddha's teachings into five categories: 
 The teaching of men and gods (人天教),
 The teachings of the Hinayana (小乘教), 
 The teaching of the Mahayana on phenomenal appearances (大乘法相教), 
 The teaching of the Mahayana on destroying appearances (大乘破相教) and 
 The teaching of the Ekayāna that reveals the nature (一乘顯性教) (intrinsic enlightenment).

In Zongmi's teaching, the "nature" of each person is identical with Buddha-nature, which is emphasised in Chan. He stated, "To designate it, initially there is only one true spiritual nature, that is not born, does not die, does not increase, does not decrease, does not become, and does not change." In giving this teaching the highest position, Zongmi altered the classification of Fazang, who regarded the Hua-yen teachings to be the supreme teachings and established the common denominator of Chan and Huayen teachings within the "One Vehicle" (Ekayāna).

Zongmi's Analysis of the Five Different Types of Chan
In his discussion of the various meanings of Chan, Zongmi explains the meaning of chan (< Sanskrit dhyāna "meditative states") in terms of five categories as befits the differences in human aptitudes.

(1) The first is that form of meditation practised by non-Buddhists that seeks rebirth in the higher realms and avoidance of rebirth in the lower realms. It corresponds to the teachings of Confucianism and Daoism.

(2) The second is that form of meditation practised by Buddhists who have a correct understanding of cause and effect and who seek rebirth in the higher realms and avoidance of rebirth in the lower realms. It corresponds to the teaching of humans and gods in Zongmi's classification of Buddhist teachings.

(3) The third is that form of meditation practised by Theravada Buddhists who have realized the emptiness of self.

(4) The fourth is that form of meditation practised by Māhayāna Buddhists who have realized the emptiness of all things (dharmas) in addition to the emptiness of self.

The first four types of chan all involve the progressive mastery of a hierarchical sequence of meditative stages and are therefore gradual, in contradistinction to the fifth type of chan, which was introduced by Bodhidharma and which is sudden.

(5) The fifth is that form of meditation practised "based on the sudden insight that one’s own mind is intrinsically pure, that from the beginning it is devoid of the defilements, that originally it is fully endowed with the nature of untainted wisdom, that this mind is the Buddha, and that ultimately there is no difference between them"—which Zongmi refers to as the chan of the supreme vehicle.

Analysis of Mind
Zongmi saw enlightenment and its opposite, delusion, as ten reciprocal steps that are not so much separate processes, but parallel processes moving in opposite directions.

Zongmi follows the One Vehicle interpretation of the Yogachara analysis of the Eight Consciousnesses that is found in the Laṅkāvatāra Sūtra and the Awakening of Faith in the Mahayana in describing the phenomenology of the mind.

In Zongmi's vision, the Real Mind is the true nature which is revealed at the moment of awakening. Before this awakening, True Mind is deluded by thoughts and wrong visions. The phenomenal appearance of this true mind is the Buddha-nature and its deluded manifestation is the store-house consciousness, or citta, the eighth and fundamental consciousness in Yogachara thought. From this deluded consciousness springs manas, the grasping consciousness, which is the seventh consciousness. From there springs the cognitive mind (sixth consciousness) and the five sense-consciousnesses.

Criticism of Chan-schools
Zongmi gave critiques on seven Chan schools in his Prolegomenon to the Collection of Expressions of the Zen Source and although he promoted his own Ho-tse school as exemplifying the highest practice, his accounts of the other schools were balanced and unbiased. It is clear from his writings that in many cases he visited the various Chan monasteries he wrote about and took notes of his discussions with teachers and adepts. His work had an enduring influence on the adaptation of Indian Buddhism to the philosophy of traditional Chinese culture. The writings that remain have proved to be an invaluable source for modern scholars of the history of the development of Buddhism in China.

Hung-chou school
Zongmi was critical of Chan sects that seemed to ignore the moral order of traditional Buddhism and Confucianism. For example, while he saw the Northern line as believing "everything as altogether false", Zongmi claimed the Hung-chou tradition, derived from Mazu Daoyi (709–788), believed "everything as altogether true".

According to Zongmi, the Hung-chou school teaching led to a radical nondualism that believed that all actions, good or bad, as expressing essential Buddha-nature, denying the need for spiritual cultivation and moral discipline. This was a dangerously antinomian view as it eliminated all moral distinctions and validated any actions as expressions of the essence of Buddha-nature.

While Zongmi acknowledged that the essence of Buddha-nature and its functioning in the day-to-day reality are but difference aspects of the same reality, he insisted that there is a difference. To avoid the dualism he saw in the Northern Line and the radical nondualism and antinomianism of the Hung-chou school, Zongmi's paradigm preserved "an ethically critical duality within a larger ontological unity", an ontology which he claimed was lacking in Hung-chou Chan.

Northern Chan
Zongmi's critique of Northern Chan was based on its practice of removing impurities of the mind to reach enlightenment. Zongmi criticized this on the basis that the Northern school was under the misconception that impurities were "real" as opposed to "empty" (i.e., lack any independent reality of their own) and therefore this was a dualistic teaching. Zongmi, on the other hand, saw impurities of the mind as intrinsically "empty" and naturally removable by the intrinsically pure nature of the mind. This understanding of Zongmi came from the Awakening of Faith in the Mahayana scripture which espoused the "Buddha-nature doctrine" of the intrinsically enlightened nature possessed by all beings.

Oxhead school
His criticism of another prominent Chan lineage of the time, the Oxhead school, was also based on the tathāgatagarbha doctrine but in this case Zongmi saw their teaching as a one-sided understanding of emptiness. He claimed that the Oxhead School taught "no mind" (i.e., the emptiness of mind) but did not recognize the functioning of the mind, assuming that the intrinsically enlightened nature is likewise "empty" and "that there is nothing to be cognized". Zongmi went on to say, "we know that this teaching merely destroys our attachment to feelings but does not yet reveal the nature that is true and luminous".

Writings
Zongmi's writings were extensive and influential. There is no certainty about the quantity of Zongmi's writings. Zongmi's epitaph, written by P’ei Hsiu, (787?–860) listed over ninety fascicles. Tsan-ning's (919–1001) biography claimed over two hundred.

For modern scholars, Zongmi provides the "most valuable sources on Tang dynasty Zen. There is no other extant source even remotely as informative".

Unfortunately, many of Zongmi's works are lost, including his Collected Writings on the Source of Ch’an (Ch’an-yüan chu-ch’üan-chi) which would provide modern scholars with an invaluable source to reconstruct Tang dynasty Chan.

Commentary on the Sutra of Perfect Enlightenment 
Zongmi's first major work was his commentary and subcommentary on Sūtra of Perfect Enlightenment, completed in 823–824. The subcommentary contains extensive data on the teachings, the ideas and practices on the seven houses of Chan. These data are derived from personal experience and observations. These observations provide excellent sources on Tang dynasty Chan for modern studies.

Chart of Zen Succession 
The Chart of the Master-Disciple Succession of the Chan Gate That Has Transmitted the Mind-Ground in China (Chung-hua ch’uan-hsin-ti ch’an-men shih-tzu ch’eng-his t’u), was written at the request of P’ei Hsiu sometime between 830 and 833. The work clarifies the major Ch’an traditions of the Tang era. It contains detailed critiques of the Northern School, the Ox-head School and the two branches of Southern Chan, the Hung-chou and his own Ho-tse (Heze) lines.

The Prolegomenon 
The Prolegomenon to the Collection of Expressions of the Zen Source, also known as the Chan Preface, was written around 833. It provides a theoretical basis for Zongmi's vision of the correlation between Chan and the Buddhist scriptures. It gives accounts of the several lineages extant at the time, many of which had died out by the time of the Song dynasty (960–1279). In this preface, Zongmi says that he had assembled the contemporary Chan practices and teachings into ten categories. Unfortunately, the collection itself is lost, and only the preface exists.

On the Original Nature of Man 
Zongmi's Inquiry into the Origin of Humanity, (or On the Original Nature of Man, or The Debate on an Original Person) (原人論 Yüanren lun) was written sometime between 828 and 835. This essay became one of his best-known works.

It surveys the current major Buddhist teachings of the day, as well as Confucian and Taoist teachings. The text aims to show not only how Buddhism is superior to the native Chinese philosophies, but also to present a hierarchy of the profundity of the Buddhist schools. Zongmi criticizes Confucianism for not having an adequate moral system or explanation of causation. He holds up the Buddhist view of karma as the superior system of moral responsibility.

De Bary writes, 

However, his goal was not to wholly denigrate or invalidate the Chinese philosophies, but to integrate them into Buddhist teachings to reach a greater understanding of how the human condition came into being.

The writing style is simple and straightforward, and the content not overly technical, making the work accessible to non-Buddhist intellectuals of the day.

Commentary on the Awakening of Faith in the Mahayana 
The undated commentary on the Awakening of Faith in the Mahayana was probably written between 823 and 828. Although Zongmi is recognized as a Huayan patriarch, he considered the Awakening of Faith in the Mahayana scripture to exemplify the highest teaching, displacing the Huayan Sūtra as the supreme Buddhist teaching.

Meditation-manual
Around the same time he wrote a major work in eighteen fascicles called A Manual of Procedures for the Cultivation and Realization of Ritual Practice according to the Scripture of Perfect Enlightenment. In this work, Zongmi discusses the conditions of practice, the methods of worship and the method of seated meditation (zazen).

Notes

References

Sources

Bibliography
 Ainbinder, Lori Denise (1996). The man in the middle: an introduction to the life and work of Gui-feng Zong-mi, MA Thesis, The University of British Columbia
 Oh, Kang Nam (2000) The Taoist Influence on Hua-yen Buddhism: A Case of the Sinicization of Buddhism in China, Chung-Hwa Buddhist Journal, No. 13.2, pp277–297
 Shi, Hu (1953) Chan_in_China.html Ch'an (Zen) Buddhism in China Its History and Method Philosophy East and West, Vol.. 3, No. 1 (January, 1953), pp. 3–24

External links
 Digital Dictionary of Buddhism
 Ray, Gary L. (n.d.) The Northern Ch'an School And Sudden Versus Gradual Enlightenment Debates In China And Tibet Institute of Buddhist Studies
 Peter N. Gregory (1985), Tsung-Mi and the single word "awareness"(chih)

780 births
841 deaths
Chinese scholars of Buddhism
Chan Buddhists
Huayan Buddhists
Tang dynasty Buddhist monks
Chinese Zen Buddhists
Chinese spiritual writers
Writers from Nanchong
Philosophers from Sichuan